= Constituency W-330 =

Provincial constituency of Punjab, Pakistan

W-330
- Woman Reserved constituency for the Provincial Assembly of Punjab

Current constituency

Constituency W-330 is a reserved Constituency for female in the Provincial Assembly of Punjab.

== See also ==
- Punjab, Pakistan
